Masada: Yod, also known as י or Masada 10, is a 1998 album by American composer and saxophonist John Zorn released on the Japanese DIW label.   It is the tenth album of Masada recordings.

Reception

The Allmusic review by Jim Smith awarded the album 4 stars stating "From its first manic blast, it's clear that Masada, Vol. 10: Yod is going to be one of John Zorn and company's wildest, most confident works... What continues to impress in this, their tenth release, is the group's relentless energy and the sheer brilliance of their interplay".

Track listing 
All compositions by John Zorn.
 "Ruach" – 4:07
 "Kilayim" – 3:22
 "Taltalim" – 6:46
 "Hashmal" – 3:23
 "Tevel" – 5:49
 "Segulah" – 5:32
 "Yechida" – 7:49
 "Tzalim" – 3:21
 "Nashim" – 4:39
 "Abrakala" – 14:28
 "Zevul" – 2:16
 Recorded at Avatar, New York City on September 15, 1997

Personnel 
 John Zorn – alto saxophone
 Dave Douglas – trumpet
 Greg Cohen – bass
 Joey Baron – drums

References

1998 albums
Masada (band) albums
Albums produced by John Zorn
DIW Records albums